ARF may refer to:

Organizations
 Advertising Research Foundation
 Animal Rescue Foundation
 Armenian Revolutionary Federation
 ASEAN Regional Forum

People
 Cahit Arf (1910–1997), Turkish mathematician

Science, medicine, and mathematics
 Acute renal failure
 Acute rheumatic fever
 ADP ribosylation factor, a small GTP-binding protein
 The Arf invariant in mathematics
 Argon fluoride laser or ArF laser
 Atomic Resonance Filter or atomic line filter
 Auxin Response Factors in plants
 p14arf or ARF tumor suppressor

Other uses
 Arf (Nanoha), character in Magical Girl Lyrical Nanoha
 Abuse Reporting Format
 Almost-Ready-to-Fly model aircraft
 The Azkena Rock Festival, Vitoria-Gasteiz, Spain